Andrea Leand (born January 18, 1964) is a former professional tennis player from the U.S. Leand was the No. 1 ranked junior in the United States and the No. 2 ranked junior in the World in 1981. She won a gold medal in singles at the 1981 Maccabiah Games in Israel. Leand rose to a career high ranking of No. 12. Leand was ranked in the top 10 of the world doubles rankings reaching the quarterfinals at Wimbledon in 1983. Leand represented the United States at the Federation Cup in 1982 and the Olympics in 1984.

Early life
Leand is the first child of Paul Leand, a chest and throat surgeon who in college played tennis for Yale University, and Barbara Goldberg Leand, who once had a tennis ranking in the Middle Atlantic region.

Education
In 1988, Leand graduated from Princeton University, where she completed a Bachelor of Science degree in psychology. She also earned an MBA degree from Johns Hopkins University Carey Business School in 2002.

Career in sports  
Andrea Leand was the No. 1 ranked junior in the United States and the No. 2 ranked junior in the World in 1981. She won a gold medal in women's singles at the 1981 Maccabiah Games in Israel.

She turned pro in 1982 and appeared on the WTA pro rankings for the first time at No.18, a record for the highest first-time appearance in the pro tennis rankings that she still holds today. Leand rose to a career high No. 12. Leand was ranked in the top 10 of the world doubles rankings reaching the quarterfinals at Wimbledon in 1983.

Leand represented the United States at the Federation Cup in 1982 and the Olympics in 1984. She competed on the WTA tour from 1981 to 1994. She won a singles title at the Pittsburgh Open in 1984 after a three-sets victory in the final against Pascale Paradis. Leand reached the fourth round of the US Open on three occasions, at Wimbledon once, and the French Open once. She upset second-seeded Andrea Jaeger at the 1981 U.S. Open.

Later career 
After 15 years on the pro tour, Leand pursued careers in journalism and broadcasting, as contributor to multiple publications including USA Today, The New York Times, and The Baltimore Sun and TennisMatch Magazine. She also was a lead commentator for ESPN/STAR television for 10 years. She later became certified as an investment advisor for Morgan Stanley. Leand was named publisher of Tennis Week Magazine in 2007.

WTA career finals

Doubles (1 title, 2 runner-ups)

References

External links
 
 

1964 births
Living people
American female tennis players
Jewish American sportspeople
Jewish tennis players
Maccabiah Games gold medalists for the United States
Maccabiah Games medalists in tennis
Competitors at the 1981 Maccabiah Games
Tennis people from Maryland
Johns Hopkins Carey Business School alumni
Princeton University alumni
21st-century American Jews
21st-century American women